This article refers to the history of Abkhazia from its pre-historic settlement by the lower-paleolithic hunter-gatherers  to the post-1992-1993 war situation.

Prehistoric settlement 

Lower Paleolithic hunting-gathering encampments formed the first known settlements on the territory of modern-day Abkhazia. The earliest examples have been unearthed at the sites of Iashkhtva, Gumista, Kelasuri, and Ochamchire. Upper Paleolithic culture settled chiefly on the coastline. Mesolithic and Neolithic periods brought larger permanent settlements and marked the beginning of farming, animal husbandry, and the production of ceramics. The earliest artifacts of megalithic culture appeared in the early 3rd millennium BC and continued into the Bronze Age as the so-called dolmens of Abkhazia, typically consisting of four upright mass stones and a capstone, some of them weighing as much as 50 tonnes. A dolmen from the Eshera archaeological site is the best-studied prehistoric monument of this type. The Late Bronze Age saw the development of more advanced bronze implements and continued into the Iron Age as a part of the Colchian culture (c. 1200-600 BCE), which covered most of what is now western Georgia and part of northeastern Anatolia.

Abkhazia in antiquity 
The written history of Abkhazia largely begins with the coming of the Milesian Greeks to the coastal Colchis in the 6th-5th centuries BC. They founded their maritime colonies along the eastern shore of the Black Sea, with Dioscurias being one of the most important centers of trade. This city, said to be so named for the Dioscuri, the twins Castor and Pollux of classical mythology, is presumed to have subsequently developed into the modern-day Sukhumi. Other notable colonies were Gyenos, Triglitis, and later Pityus, arguably near the modern-day coastal towns of Ochamchire, Gagra, and Pitsunda, respectively.

The peoples of the region were notable for their number and variety, as classical sources testify. Herodotus, Strabo, and Pliny appreciate the multitude of languages spoken in Dioscurias and other towns. The mountainous terrain tended to separate and isolate local peoples from one another and encouraged the development of dozens of separate languages and dialects complicating the ethnic makeup of the region. Even the most well-informed contemporary authors are very confused when naming and locating these peoples and provide only very limited information about the geography and population of the hinterland. Furthermore, some classic ethnic names were presumably collective terms, and supposed considerable migrations also took place around the region. Various attempts have been made to identify these peoples with the ethnic terms employed by classical authors. Most scholars identify Pliny the Elder's Apsilae of the 1st century and Arrian’s Abasgoi of the 2nd century with the probable proto-Abkhaz- and Abaza-speakers respectively, while Georgian scholars consider them proto-Kartvelian tribal designations. The identity and origin of other peoples (e.g., Heniochi, Sanigae) dwelling in the area is disputed. Archaeology has seldom been able to make strong connections between the remains of material culture and the opaque names of peoples mentioned by classical writers. Thus, controversies continue and a series of questions remain open.

The inhabitants of the region engaged in piracy, slave trade, and kidnapping people for ransom. Strabo described the habits of Achaei, Zygi, and Heniochi in his Geography as follows:

According to The Georgian Chronicles, the first inhabitants of what is now Abkhazia and the whole western Georgia were Egrosians, the descendants of Egros son of Togarmah, grandson of Japhet, son of Noah, who came from the land known as Arian-Kartli.

Roman and Early Byzantine era
Along with the rest of Colchis, Abkhazia was conquered by Mithridates VI Eupator of Pontus between c. 110 and 63 BC, then taken by the Roman commander Pompey and incorporated into the Roman Empire in AD 61. The Roman rule here was tenuous and according to Josephus a Roman garrison of 3000 hoplites and a fleet of 40 vessels could only control the ports. The Greek settlements suffered from the wars, piracy, and attacks of local tribes (during one of them Dioskurias and Pityus were sacked in AD 50).

In the 3rd century AD, the Lazi tribe came to dominate most of Colchis, establishing the kingdom of Lazica, locally known as Egrisi. It was subordinate to Constantinople; its kings had to be confirmed by the emperor and it contributed to the imperial treasury. By the 5th century, according to Procopius, the kings of Lazica no longer paid taxes to the empire, appointed the dukes of Abkhaz and Svans without consultation and garrisoned Sevastopolis. The endorsement of the rulers of Lazica by the emperor became a formality.

Colchis was a scene of the protracted rivalry between the Eastern Roman/Byzantine and Sassanid empires, culminating in the Lazic War from 542 to 562. The war resulted in the decline of Lazica, and the Abasgi in their dense forests won a degree of autonomy under the Byzantine authority. During this era, the Byzantines built Sebastopolis in the region. Their land, known to the Byzantines as Abasgia, was a prime source of eunuchs for the empire until Justinian I (527-565) forbid the castration of boys. The people were pagan and worshiped groves and trees until a mission sent by the emperor Justinian I around 550 converted the people to Christianity and built a church. However bishop Stratophiles of Pytius attended the Council of Nicaea as early as 325. Byzantines constructed defensive fortifications that may have partially survived to this day as the Kelasuri Wall.

Medieval Abkhazia 

As the Abasgi grew in relative strength, the name Abasgia came to denote a larger area populated by various ethnic groups including Mingrelian- and Svan-speaking South Caucasian tribes, and subordinated to the Byzantine-appointed princes (Greek: archon, Georgian: eristavi) who resided in Anacopia and were viewed as major champions of the empire's political and cultural influence in the western Caucasus. The Arabs penetrated the area in the 730s, but did not subdue it; about then the term Abkhazeti ("the land of the Abkhazians") first appeared in the Georgian annals, giving rise to the name Abkhazia, which is used today in most foreign languages.

Through their dynastic intermarriages and alliance with other Georgian princes, the Abasgian dynasty acquired most of Lazica/Egrisi, and in the person of Leo established themselves as "kings of the Abkhazians" in the 780s, even though the title was not recognised by the emperor in Constantinople who continued to call him archon when sending a gold ring of investiture. Leo married his daughter to the Khazar khan thus securing the northern frontiers and helping counter the Byzantine influence. 
The capital of the kingdom was transferred to the Georgian city of Kutaisi. In order to eliminate the Byzantine religious influence, the dynasty subordinated the local dioceses to the Georgian Orthodox patriarchate of Mtskheta. The Abkhaz participated in the rebellion of Thomas the Slav against Byzantine in 821-823. While the Byzantines sent their fleet to the Black Sea ports several times in the 9th century their ability to influence the events in the Abkhazia was limited by the internal strife and the fight against Bulgarians.

The kingdom is frequently referred in modern history writing as the Egrisi-Abkhazian kingdom due to the fact that medieval authors viewed the new monarchy as a successor state of Egrisi and sometimes used the terms interchangeably. By this time the majority of the population of the kingdom was likely Georgian. The Abkhazian Kings probably used Georgian as the state language in spite of their Abkhaz origins.

The most prosperous period of the Abkhazian kingdom was between 850 and 950, when it dominated the whole western Georgia and claimed control even of the easternmost Georgian provinces. The terms "Abkhazia" and "Abkhazians" were used in a broad sense during this period – and for some while later – and covered, for all practical purposes, all the population of the kingdom regardless of their ethnicity. In 989, the Bagratid ruler Bagrat III came to power in Abkhazia which he inherited from his mother Gurandukht Anchabadze. In 1008 Bagrat inherited K'art'li from his father and united the kingdoms of Abkhazia and Georgia into a single Georgian feudal state.

This state reached the apex of its strength and prestige under the queen Tamar (1184–1213). On one occasion, a contemporary Georgian chronicler mentions a people called Apsars. This source explains the sobriquet 'Lasha' of Tamar's son and successor George IV as meaning "enlightenment" in the language of the Apsars. Some modern linguists link this nickname to the modern Abkhaz words a-lasha for "bright", identifying the Apsars with the possible ancestors of the modern-day Abkhaz.

According to the Georgian chronicles, Queen Tamar granted the lordship over part of Abkhazia to the Georgian princely family of Shervashidze. According to traditional accounts, they were an offshoot of the Shirvanshahs (hence allegedly comes their dynastic name meaning "sons of Shirvanese" in Georgian). The ascendancy of this dynasty (later known also as Chachba by the Abkhaz form of their surname) in Abkhazia would last until the Russian annexation in the 1860s.

The Genoese established their trading factories along the Abkhazian coastline in the 14th century, but they functioned for a short time. The area was relatively spared from the Mongol and Timur's invasions, which terminated Georgia's "golden age". As a result, the kingdom of Georgia fragmentized into several independent or semi-independent entities by the late 15th century. The Principality of Abkhazia was one of them, and was formed around 1463. The Principality of Abkhazia, whereas it acted as an independent state, was officially a vassal of the Kingdom of Imereti, following a treaty signed in 1490 splitting Georgia into three nations. The Abkhazian princes engaged in incessant conflicts with the Mingrelian potentates, their nominal suzerains, and the borders of both principalities fluctuated in the course of these wars. In the following decades, the Abkhazian nobles finally prevailed and expanded their possessions up to the Inguri River, which is today's southern boundary of the region. Several medieval historians like Vakhushti and a few modern ones claimed that the Kelasuri Wall was built by prince Levan II Dadiani of Mingrelia as a protection against Abkhaz.

Ottoman rule 
In the 1570s, the Ottoman navy occupied the fort of Tskhumi on the Abkhazian coastline, turning it into the Turkish fortress of Suhum-Kale (hence, the modern name of the city of Sukhumi). In 1555, Georgia and the whole South Caucasus became divided between the Ottoman and Safavid Persian empires per the Peace of Amasya, with Abkhazia, along with all of western Georgia, remaining in the hands of the Ottomans. As a result, Abkhazia came under the increasing influence of Turkey and Islam, gradually losing its cultural and religious ties with the rest of Georgia. According to the Soviet historical science, Turkey, after the conquest has aimed at obliterating the material and spiritual culture of Abkhazia and forcibly convert the population to Islam, which led to numerous insurrections (in 1725, 1728, 1733, 1771 and 1806) 

Towards the end of the 17th century, the principality of Abkhazia broke up into several fiefdoms, depriving many areas of any centralized authority. The region became a theatre of widespread slave trade and piracy. According to some Georgian scholars (such as Pavle Ingorokva), it was when a number of the Adyghe clansmen migrated from the North Caucasus mountains and blended with the local ethnic elements, significantly changing the region's demographic situation. In the mid-18th century, the Abkhazians revolted against the Ottoman rule and took hold of Suhum-Kale, but soon the Turks regained the control of the fortress and granted it to a loyal prince of the Shervashidze family.

Russian rule 
Russia annexed eastern Georgia in 1800 and took over Mingrelia in 1803. Kelesh Ahmed-Bey Shervashidze, the last pre-Russian ruler of Abkhazia had a long and successful reign. He controlled his nobles, his kinsmen commanded Poti and Batum and his fleet cruised the coast from Anapa and Batum. His invasion of the Principality of Mingrelia in 1802 contributed to Mingrelia becoming a Russian protectorate. Keleshbey died in 1808 and was succeeded by his eldest son Aslan-Bey Shervashidze. Kelesh also had a younger son, Sefer Ali-Bey Shervashidze, who lived in Mingrelia, was or became a Christian and was married to the Mingrellian ruler's sister. The Russians or Mingrelians claimed that Aslan-Bey had murdered his father. In August 1808, three months after Kelesh's death, a Mingrelian force failed to take Sukhumi. In February 1810 Russia recognized Sefer-Bey as hereditary prince of Abkhazia. In June of that year a Russian fleet captured Sukhumi and Aslan-Bey fled. Sefer-Bey, who ruled until 1821, was unable to control the countryside, things became disorganized and there were a number of revolts involving Aslan-Bey.

Initially, the Russian control hardly extended beyond Suhum-kale and the Bzyb area, with the rest of the region chiefly dominated by the pro-Turkish Muslim nobility. In a series of conflicts with the Ottoman Empire and the North Caucasian tribes, the Russians acquired possession of the whole Abkhazia in a piecemeal fashion between 1829 and 1842, but their power was not firmly established until 1864, when they managed to abolish the local princely authority. The last prince of Abkhazia, Michael Shervashidze (Chachba), was exiled to Russia where he soon died. The two ensuing Abkhaz revolts in 1866 and 1877, the former precipitated by the heavy taxation and the latter incited by the landing of the Turkish troops, resulted in the next significant change in the region's demographics. As a result of harsh government reaction allegedly 60% of the Muslim Abkhaz population, although contemporary census reports were not very trustworthy — became Muhajirs, and emigrated to the Ottoman possessions between 1866 and 1878. In 1881, the number of the Abkhaz in the Russian Empire was estimated at only 20,000. Furthermore, a great deal of the population was forcibly displaced to Turkey (Muhajirs) and in 1877 the population of Abkhazia was 78,000, whereas at the end of the same year there were only 46,000 left.

Large areas of the region were left uninhabited and many Armenians, Georgians, Russians and others subsequently migrated to Abkhazia, resettling much of the vacated territory. According to Georgian historians Georgian tribes (Mingrelians and Svans) had populated Abkhazia since the time of the Colchis kingdom. According to the census carried out in 1897 Abkhaz constituted 60-65% of the Sukhumi district's population (about 100,000; Sukhum district occupied almost the same territory as present'day Abkhazia in 1897), the majority of the rest being Georgian. However the Encyclopædia Britannica reported in 1911 that in the Sukhumi district (population at the time 43,000; it did not cover all the territory of present-day Abkhazia in 1911 as some of it had been transferred to Kuban governorate) two-thirds of the population were Mingrelian Georgians and one-third were Abkhaz. Those Abkhaz, who did not convert to Christianity, and who remained in Abkhazia were declared by the Russian government a "refugee population" and deprived of the right to settle in the coastal areas.

Meanwhile, in 1870, bound peasants, including slaves, were liberated in Abkhazia as a part of the Russian serfdom reforms. The peasants got between 3 and 8 ha and had to pay huge redemption payments (the landowners got up to 275 ha); furthermore, according to a contemporary Russian official, peasants were mostly left with rocky mountain slopes and low-lying bogs. The liberation in Abkhazia was more problematic than elsewhere as it failed to take into account fully the distinction between free, partly free and unfree peasants in the Abkhazian society.

This reform triggered the moderate development of capitalism in the region. Tobacco, tea and subtropical crops became more widely grown. Industries (coal, timber) began to develop. Health resorts started to be built. A small town of Gagra, acquired by a German prince Peter of Oldenburg, a member of the Russian royal family, turned to a resort of particular tourist interest early in the 1900s (decade).

After the abolition of the autocephalous status of the Georgian Church (1811) begins the process of Russification and the Abkhaz Church. An attempt to transfer service from Georgian into Slavic, there is also a desire to introduce as an antagonist of the Georgian - Abkhazian (Apsua) identity. Against this trend, actively advocated the advanced Abkhazian society, trying to convince Russian officials that Abkhazia historically, in their culture, religion, etc., is an integral part of Georgia. In 1870, in a memo to deputies of the Abkhazian nobility and Samurzakan (Emhvari B., M. Marchand, Margani T., K. Inal-ipa) to the Chairman of the Tiflis Committee of caste landed for Prince Svyatopolk-Mirsky emphasized that " Abkhazia ancient times was part of the former Georgian kingdom ... " The note provides evidence to support the common historical destiny of the Georgian and Abkhaz peoples, who are, according to the authors, "important witnesses accessories Abkhazia to Georgia" and expressed the hope that they (Abkhazians) are not are "excluded from the overall family of the Georgian people, to which from time immemorial belonged to." 4 In 1916, the Tbilisi visited the Abkhazian delegation consisting of M-princes Shervashidze M. Emhvari, A. Inal-ipa, and representatives of the peasantry P. Anchabadze, B. Ezugbaya and A. Chukbar. On behalf of the Abkhaz people, they petitioned for economic and cultural development of the region and raised the question of the transformation of the Sukhumi district into a separate province. "If this is impossible", told delegates, then in any case do not connect it (Sukhum district) to any other province, except Kutaisi. Equally urgent was the demand of the deputation is not separated from the exarchate of Georgia Sukhumi bishoprics, which has always been an inseparable part of the Georgian Church.

In the Russian revolution of 1905, most Abkhaz remained largely loyal to the Russian rule, while Georgians tended to oppose it. As a reward for their allegiance, tsar Nicholas II officially forgave the Abkhaz for their opposition in the 19th century and removed their status of a "guilty people" in 1907. This split along political divisions led to the rise of mistrust and tensions between the Georgian and Abkhaz communities which would further deepen in the aftermath of the Russian Revolution of 1917.

Abkhazia from 1917 to 1921 

The Bolshevik coup in October 1917 and the ensuing Russian Civil War forced the major national forces of South Caucasus – Armenia, Azerbaijan, and Georgia – to unite into fragile federative structures. Abkhaz leaders created, on November 8, 1917, their own post-revolutionary body, Abkhaz People's Council (APC), but Abkhazia became embroiled into a chaos of the civil unrest. It was torn between supporters of the short-lived Mountainous Republic of the Northern Caucasus, a pro-Bolshevik faction, a pro-Turkish nobility, and a pro-Georgian Menshevik group.

In March 1918, local Bolsheviks under the leadership of Nestor Lakoba, a close associate of Joseph Stalin, capitalized on agrarian disturbances and, supported by the revolutionary peasant militias, kiaraz, won power in Sukhumi in April 1918. The Transcaucasian Democratic Federative Republic, which claimed the region as its part, sanctioned the suppression of the revolt and, on May 17, the National Guard of Georgia ousted the Bolshevik commune in Sukhumi.

Meanwhile, a short-lived Transcaucasian federation came to an end and the independence of the Democratic Republic of Georgia (DRG) was proclaimed on May 26, 1918. On June 8, a delegation of the APC negotiated, in Tbilisi, the capital of Georgia, a union with Georgia, which gave autonomy to Abkhazia. All domestic affairs were to be under the jurisdiction of the APC, while the central government established the office of Minister of Abkhazian Affairs and the post of the Governor-General of Abkhazia. Abkhaz deputies gained three of 28 seats preserved for ethnic minorities in Georgia's parliament.

The relations between the central and autonomous authorities were soon clouded by the abortive landing, on June 27, 1918, of a Turkish force supported by the Abkhaz nobles, J. Marghan and A. Shervashidze. Georgia responded with the arrest of several Abkhaz leaders and the limitation of the autonomous powers of the APC that precipitated some sympathies from the Abkhaz to the Russian White forces which engaged in the sporadic fighting with the Georgians in the north of Abkhazia. The reaction was even harsher when the Abkhaz officers of the Georgian army, Commissar Marghania and Colonel Chkhotua, staged a failed coup in October 1918. On October 10, the APC was disbanded and Abkhazia's autonomy was abrogated for six months. A new Abkhaz People's Council, elected in February 1919, adopted an act of Abkhazia's autonomy within the framework of the DRG, which was also supported by the Soviet government. The status was confirmed in the Constitution of Georgia adopted on February 21, 1921, on the eve of the Soviet invasion of Georgia.

Soviet Abkhazia 

Despite the 1920 treaty of non-aggression, Soviet Russia’s 11th Red Army invaded Georgia on February 11, 1921, and marched on Tbilisi. Almost simultaneously, 9th (Kuban) Army entered Abkhazia on February 19. Supported by the local pro-Bolshevik guerillas, the Soviet troops took control of most of Abkhazia in a series of battles from February 23 to March 7, and proceeded into the neighbouring region of Mingrelia.

On March 4, Soviet power was established in Sukhumi, with the formation of the Abkhazian Soviet Socialist Republic (Abkhazian SSR), subsequently recognized by the newly established Communist regime of the Georgian SSR on May 21. On December 16, however, Abkhazia signed a special "union treaty" delegating some of its sovereign powers to Soviet Georgia. Abkhazia and Georgia together entered the Transcaucasian SFSR on December 13, 1922 and on 30 December joined the Union of Soviet Socialist Republics. Abkhazia's ambiguous status of Union Republic was written into that republic's April 1, 1925 constitution. Paradoxically, an earlier reference to Abkhazia as an autonomous republic in the 1924 Soviet Constitution remained unratified until 1930 when Abkhazia's status was reduced to an Autonomous Soviet Socialist Republic (ASSR) within the Georgian SSR. Except for a few nobles, the Abkhaz did not participate in the 1924 August Uprising in Georgia, a last desperate attempt to restore the independence of Georgia from the Soviet Union.

During the Stalin years, a purge was carried out against Communist Party officials and intelligentsia of Abkhaz provenance on the orders of Lavrentiy Beria, then-the Party Secretary in Transcaucasus and himself a native of Abkhazia, in order to break a resistance to forced collectivization of land. The Abkhaz party leader Lakoba suddenly died shortly after his visit to Beria in Tbilisi in December 1936. There was a strong suspicion that he was poisoned by Beria who declared Lakoba an "enemy of the people" posthumously. The purges in Abkhazia were accompanied by the suppression of Abkhaz ethnic culture: the Latin-based Abkhaz alphabet was changed into Georgian and all the native language schools were closed, ethnic Georgians were guaranteed key official positions, many place names were changed to Georgian ones. In the terror of 1937-38, the ruling elite was purged of Abkhaz and by 1952 over 80% of the 228 top party and government officials and enterprise managers were ethnic Georgians; there remained 34 Abkhaz, 7 Russians and 3 Armenians in these positions. Between 1937 and 1953 tens of thousands of peasants from Western Georgia were settled in Abkhazia. In the 1926 Soviet census, the Abkhaz accounted for 26.4% of the region's population. The demographic engineering of the late Stalin period brought this proportion down to 17—18%. Abkhazia is mountainous and has a shortage of arable land, which made it difficult to send in new settlers. This was one of the reasons why in 1949 the Greek and Turkish minorities were deported from Abkhazia to Kazakhstan and other Central Asian republics, and Georgians were settled in the formerly Greek and Turkish villages. Abkhazia experienced collectivisation in 1936–1938, much later than most of USSR.

Stalin's five-year plans also resulted in the resettlement of many Russians, Armenians and Georgians into the existing Abkhaz, Georgian, Greek and other minority population to work in the growing agricultural sector. The 2,700-year-old Greek population of Abkhazia was completely deported by Stalin in a single night in 1949 to Central Asia with Georgian immigrants taking over their homes. In 1959 the surviving Greeks were allowed to return. During the 1992-93 war, some 15,000 Greeks fled the turmoil in the region to Greece.

The repression of the Abkhaz and other groups ended after Stalin's death and Beria's execution (1953), and Abkhaz were given a greater role in the governance of the republic. As in most of the smaller autonomous republics, the Soviet government encouraged the development of culture and particularly of literature. A new script, based on Cyrillic, was devised for Abkhaz, Abkhaz schools reopened; and administration put largely in the Abkhaz hands. Ethnic quotas were established for certain bureaucratic posts, giving the Abkhaz a degree of political power that was disproportionate to their minority status in the republic.

The following three decades were marked by attempts of the Abkhaz Communist elite to make the autonomous structures more Abkhaz, but their efforts constantly met resistance from the Georgians. Abkhaz nationalists attempted on several occasions, most notably in 1978, to convince Moscow to transfer the autonomous republic from Georgian SSR to the Russian SFSR. That year, the Abkhaz organised a series of indoor and outdoor rallies (including an all-ethnic meeting of Abkhaz in Lykhny) in response to the mass demonstrations of Georgians who had succeeded in winning for their language a constitutional status of the official language of the Georgian SSR. Although the Abkhaz request of the secession from Georgia was rejected Moscow and Tbilisi responded with serious economic and cultural concessions, appropriating an extra 500 million rubles (or more) over seven years for the development of infrastructure and cultural projects such as the foundation of the Abkhazian State University (with Abkhaz, Georgian, and Russian sectors), a State Folk Ensemble in Sukhumi, and Abkhaz-language television broadcasting. Substantial quotas were also given to ethnic Abkhaz in educational and official positions. For example, by 1990 most of government ministers and regional Communist party department heads were ethnic Abkhaz. Even though these concessions eased tensions only partially they made Abkhazia prosperous even by the standards of Georgia which was one of the wealthiest Soviet republic of that time. The favourable geographic and climatic conditions were successfully exploited to make Abkhazia a destination for hundreds of thousands of tourists, gaining for the region a reputation of "Soviet Riviera."

History of Education in Abkhazia 

The Soviet authorities invested significantly into building a modern educational system in Abkhazia. In the 1920s and 1930s the Soviet government founded many new schools and several educational and training colleges (called “Uschiliche” in Russian language). 
The number of locally trained professionals grew from few dozens in the 1920s to several thousands in the 1980s.

By the 1980s, Sukhumi City became a home for largest educational institutions (both higher education institutions and Technical Vocational Education and Training (TVET) colleges) and largest students' community in Abkhazia.

There was some decline in a number of students in the 1990s. However, between 2000 and 2019 the student's population stabilised. Since the academic year 2020-2021 the number of college and university students even showed a small increase.

Abkhaz State University (1979) has 42 departments organized into 8 faculties providing education to about 3300 students (as of 2019, est.).

According to the official statistical data, Abkhazia has 13 TVET colleges (as of 2019, est.) providing education and vocational training to youth mostly in the capital city, though there are several colleges in all major district centers. Independent international assessments suggest that these colleges train in about 20 different specialties attracting between 1000 and 1300 young people (aged between 16 and 29) (as of 2019, est.). The largest colleges are as follows:

Abkhaz Multiindustrial College (1959) (from 1959 to 1999 - Sukhumi Trade and Culinary School),

Sukhumi State College (1904) (from 1904 to 1921 - Sukhumi Real School; from 1921 to 1999 - Sukhumi Industrial Technical School),

Sukhumi Art College (1935),

Sukhum Medical College (1931)

The Abkhazian War

As the Soviet Union began to disintegrate at the end of the 1980s, ethnic tension grew between the Abkhaz and Georgians over Georgia's moves towards independence. Many Abkhaz opposed this, fearing that an independent Georgia would lead to the elimination of their autonomy, and argued instead for the establishment of Abkhazia as a separate Soviet republic in its own right. The dispute turned violent on 16 July 1989 in Sukhumi. At least eighteen people were killed and another 137, mostly Georgians, injured when the Soviet Georgian government gave in to Georgian popular demand to transform a Georgian sector of Sukhumi State University into a branch of Tbilisi State University and the Abkhaz nationalists, including armed groups, demonstrated at the building where the entrance examinations were being held. After several days of violence, Soviet troops restored order in the city and blamed rival nationalist paramilitaries for provoking confrontations.

Georgia boycotted the March 17, 1991 all-Union referendum on the renewal of the Soviet Union proposed by Mikhail Gorbachev. However, the referendum was held in Abkhazia and 52.3% of the population of Abkhazia (virtually all the non-Georgians) took part, and participants voted by an overwhelming majority (98.6%) in favour of preserving the Union. Most of the non-Georgian population subsequently declined to participate in the March 31 referendum on Georgia's independence, which was supported by a huge majority of the population of Georgia. Shortly after it Georgia declared independence on 9 April 1991, under the rule of nationalist and former Soviet dissident Zviad Gamsakhurdia.

Gamsakhurdia's rule became unpopular, and that December, the Georgian National Guard, under the command of Tengiz Kitovani, laid siege to the offices of Gamsakhurdia's government in Tbilisi. After weeks of stalemate, he was forced to resign in January 1992. Gamsakhurdia was replaced as president by Eduard Shevardnadze, the former Soviet foreign minister and architect of the disintegration of the Soviet Union.

On 21 February 1992, Georgia's ruling Military Council announced that it was abolishing the Soviet-era constitution and restoring the 1921 Constitution of the Democratic Republic of Georgia. Many Abkhaz interpreted this as an abolition of their autonomous status. In response, on 23 July 1992, the Abkhazia government effectively declared secession from Georgia, although this gesture went unrecognized by any other country. The Georgian government accused Gamsakhurdia supporters of kidnapping Georgia's interior minister and holding him captive in Abkhazia. The Georgian government dispatched 3,000 troops to the region, ostensibly to restore order. Heavy fighting between Georgian forces and Abkhazian militia broke out in and around Sukhumi. The Abkhazian authorities rejected the government's claims, claiming that it was merely a pretext for an invasion. After about a week's fighting and many casualties on both sides, Georgian government forces managed to take control of most of Abkhazia, and closed down the regional parliament.

The Abkhazians' military defeat was met with a hostile response by the self-styled Confederation of Mountain Peoples of the Caucasus, an umbrella group uniting a number of pro-Russian movements in the North Caucasus, Russia (Chechens, Cossacks, Ossetians and others). Hundreds of volunteer paramilitaries from Russia (including the then little known Shamil Basayev) joined forces with the Abkhazian separatists to fight the Georgian government forces. Regular Russian forces also reportedly sided with the secessionists. In September, the Abkhaz and Russian paramilitaries mounted a major offensive after breaking a cease-fire, which drove the Georgian forces out of large swathes of the republic. Shevardnadze's government accused Russia of giving covert military support to the rebels with the aim of "detaching from Georgia its native territory and the Georgia-Russian frontier land". The year 1992 ended with the rebels in control of much of Abkhazia northwest of Sukhumi.

The conflict remained stalemated until July 1993, following an agreement in Sochi, when the Abkhaz separatist militias launched an abortive attack on Georgian-held Sukhumi. The capital was surrounded and heavily shelled, with Shevardnadze himself trapped in the city.

Although a truce was declared at the end of July, this collapsed after a renewed Abkhaz attack in mid-September. After ten days of heavy fighting, Sukhumi fell on 27 September 1993. Eduard Shevardnadze narrowly escaped death, having vowed to stay in the city no matter what, but he was eventually forced to flee when separatist snipers fired on the hotel where he was residing. Abkhaz, North Caucasians militants and their allies committed widespread atrocities after the fall of Sukhumi. Large numbers of remaining Georgian civilians were murdered and their property was looted.

The separatist forces quickly overran the rest of Abkhazia as the Georgian government faced a second threat: an uprising by the supporters of the deposed Zviad Gamsakhurdia in the region of Mingrelia (Samegrelo). In the chaotic aftermath of defeat almost all ethnic Georgian population fled the region by sea or over the mountains escaping a large-scale ethnic cleansing initiated by the victors.

Many thousands died, including 2,000 civilians from the Abkhaz side and 5,000 from the Georgian side (Georgian estimates). Some 250,000 people, mostly ethnic Georgians were forced into exile. During the war, gross human rights violations were reported to have been done by both sides (see Human Rights Watch report), and the ethnic cleansing committed by the Abkhaz forces and their allies is recognised by the Organization for Security and Cooperation in Europe (OSCE) Summits in Budapest (1994), Lisbon (1996) and Istanbul (1999)

Post-war Abkhazia

The economic situation in the republic after war was very hard and it was aggravated by the sanctions imposed by its neighbours. Georgia and Russia closed the borders of Abkhazia to the movement of goods in 1993 and 1994 respectively. Additionally, Russia prohibited all male Abkhazians between 16 and 60 years old from crossing the border. In 1996 the Commonwealth of Independent States banned transport, trade, and financial ties with Abkhazia at state level. During the 1990s numerous people of all ethnicities left Abkhazia mainly for Russia. Since 1997 Russia effectively dropped these sanctions which tremendously helped republic's economy. In 1999, Abkhazia officially declared its independence, which was recognized by almost no other nations.

The return of Georgians to Gali district of Abkhazia was halted by the fighting which broke out there in 1998. However, from 40,000 to 60,000 refugees have returned to Gali district since 1998, including persons commuting daily across the ceasefire line and those migrating seasonally in accordance with agricultural cycles.

After several peaceful years tourists again began to visit Abkhazia, however their number is only about a half of the pre-war number.

In 2004 presidential elections were held which caused much controversy when the candidate backed by outgoing president Vladislav Ardzinba and by Russia - Raul Khadjimba - was apparently defeated by Sergey Bagapsh. The tense situation in the republic led to the cancellation of the election results by the Supreme Court. After that the deal was struck between former rivals to run jointly — Bagapsh as a presidential candidate and Khajimba as a vice presidential candidate. They received more than 90% of the votes in the new election.

After the 1992-1993 War the Upper Kodori Valley was the only part of the country that was not controlled by the Abkhazian government. It remained under the formal control of Georgian authorities however it was mainly run by a local strongman Emzar Kvitsiani. As a result of the 2006 Kodori crisis Georgia reasserted its power in the valley. Abkhazians claimed that the infiltration of the territory by Georgian armed units was a violation of the Agreement on the Ceasefire and Disengagement of Forces of May 14, 1994, however Georgia maintained that only police and security forces were employed there. Abkhaz forces occupied Kodori Valley in August 2008 as a result of an operation that coincided with the 2008 South Ossetia War.

August 2008 saw another crisis start as South Ossetia in Georgia started hostilities aimed towards secession. This violence spread somewhat into the Abkhazia region again, with added stress created by the Russian forces massing. Georgia and Russia signed a cease-fire soon after requiring Russia to withdraw.

Meanwhile, the efforts of Russia to isolate Georgian population in Abkhazia from the rest of Georgia continued. On 24 October 2008 the railroad bridge of Shamgon-Tagiloni, connecting the city of Zugdidi in Georgia with the Abkhazian Gali district (populated mainly by Georgians) was destroyed. According to Georgian and French sources it was done by Russian army; Abkhazian sources maintained it was a Georgian diversion. Per Georgian sources on 29 October 2008 Russian forces dismantled another bridge - the one situated between the villages of Orsantia (ru) and Otobaia and linking a total of five villages - Otobaia, Pichori (ru), Barghebi, Nabakevi (ru) and Gagida (ru); thus the local population was deprived of the opportunity to move freely in the region.

See also
 Abkhaz–Georgian conflict
 German involvement in Georgian–Abkhaz conflict

References

External links

Abkhazia profile / history

 
History of Georgia (country) by location